Kuhin District is a district (bakhsh) in Qazvin County, Qazvin Province, Iran. At the 2006 census, its population was 17,411, in 4,071 families.  The District has one city: Kuhin.  The District has two rural districts (dehestan): Ilat-e Qaqazan-e Gharbi Rural District and Ilat-e Qaqazan-e Sharqi Rural District.

References 

Districts of Qazvin Province
Qazvin County